To tha Rescue is the second and final studio album by American rapper D-Nice. It was released on November 26, 1991 via Jive Records and was produced by D-Nice, Naughty by Nature, Skeff Anselm and Carl Bourley. The album features guest appearances by the likes of KRS-One, Too Short, E-Marvelous, and Naughty by Nature. Though not as successful as his previous effort Call Me D-Nice, this record managed to find some success making it to #137 on the Billboard 200 and #27 on the Top R&B/Hip-Hop Albums.  It spawned three singles: "To tha Rescue", "25 ta Life" (peaked at #23 on the Hot Rap Songs) and "Time to Flow" (peaked at #15 on the Hot Rap Songs).

Track listing

Notes
 "Get in Touch With Me" featured uncredited vocals by Roz
 "And There U Have It" featured uncredited rap vocals by E-Marvelous

Personnel

Derrick Jones - performer, producer (tracks: 1-3, 8-9, 11-12), executive producer, mixing (tracks: 1-4, 8-12), keyboards, scratches, drum programming
Lawrence Parker - performer (track 3)
Roz Davies - performer (track 5)
Todd Anthony Shaw - performer (track 9)
Carl Bourelly - producer & mixing (track 5)
Skeff Anselm - producer & mixing (tracks: 6-7)
Tom Coyne - mastering
David Bellochio - keyboards
Jean-Paul Bourelly - guitar
Vincent Henry - guitar & saxophone
Anthony Rahsaan - executive producer
Naughty by Nature - performer (track 4), producer (tracks: 4, 10)
E-Marvelous - performer (track 11)

Charts

Album

Singles

References

External links

1991 albums
D-Nice albums
Jive Records albums